The seventh edition of the annual Four Hills Tournament in Germany and Austria saw Helmut Recknagel of East Germany win three out of four events and become the first ski jumper to defend his title as Four Hills champion. He also set the record for most consecutive hill victories at Four Hills tournaments (five). It was equalized by Sven Hannawald in 2002 and by Kamil Stoch in 2018.

Participating nations and athletes

Results

Oberstdorf
 Schattenbergschanze, Oberstdorf
28 December 1958

Garmisch-Partenkirchen
 Große Olympiaschanze, Garmisch-Partenkirchen
01 January 1959

Innsbruck
 Bergiselschanze, Innsbruck
04 January 1959

The third place in Innsbruck was the only podium in Anders Woldseth's career before his untimely death later that same year.

Bischofshofen
 Paul-Ausserleitner-Schanze, Bischofshofen
06 January 1959

After three victories, Helmut Recknagel went into the Bischofshofen event with a comfortable 32.2-point lead. He only finished 15th, but still beat his closest pursuer Schamov, who placed 22nd.

With a home victory, Austrian athlete Walter Habersatter interrupted Recknagel's winning streak and snatched silver in the overall ranking.

Max Bolkart's eighth place was the only Top Ten appearance of a (West) German athlete during this tournament.

Final ranking

References

External links
 FIS website
 Four Hills Tournament web site

Four Hills Tournament
1958 in ski jumping
1959 in ski jumping